Kevin Christopher McFadden (born November 12, 1955), known by his pen name Christopher Pike, is an American author. He is a bestselling author of young adult and children's fiction. Known for mystery-thrillers and supernatural horror aimed at young adults, he has also written adult fiction.

Biography
McFadden was born in New York City in 1955, but grew up in California. He attended college briefly before dropping out and working various jobs such as house painting and computer programming. He initially tried his hand at writing science fiction and adult mystery, but later began writing teen thrillers due to an editor's suggestion. 

His first novel, Slumber Party by Christopher Pike, was initially written as a supernatural thriller containing a character with pyrokinesis, which he later removed upon the request of his editor. The book was then re-written as a mystery thriller about a group of teenagers who run into bizarre and violent events during a ski weekend. His editor sold the book to Scholastic Press, which released it in 1985. Pike's next novel, Weekend, was also published through Scholastic. He would go on to publish one more novel through Scholastic, the 1986 Chain Letter, before moving to Simon and Schuster. 

Pike continued to write several young adult novels and later branched into juvenile novels under the Spooksville series title, as well as several adult novels such as his 1990 book, Sati. Spooksville was adapted into a television series in 2013 on the Hub network (now known as Discovery Family).

Adaptations 
On November 25, 1996, Pike's novel Fall into Darkness was adapted into a television film of the same name, produced by his company Christopher Pike Productions. His novels The Midnight Club and The Season of Passage have both been optioned, for a television series and film, by filmmaker Mike Flanagan for Netflix. The Midnight Club was released on Netflix on October 7, 2022. Two days after the series' release, on October 9, Flanagan confirmed that Netflix had in fact optioned "28 books" of Pike's, and that he had pitched The Midnight Club television series as "The Midnight Club — but the stories the kids tell [each other] will be other Christopher Pike books", with a plan for the series to last multiple seasons.

Works

Young adult fiction
Slumber Party (1985)
Weekend (1986)
The Tachyon Web (1986)
Last Act (1988)
Spellbound (1988)
Gimme a Kiss (1988)
Scavenger Hunt (1989)
Fall into Darkness (1990)
See You Later (1990)
Witch (1990)
Whisper of Death (1991)
Die Softly'' (1991)Bury Me Deep (1991)Master of Murder (1992)Monster (1992)Road to Nowhere (1993)The Eternal Enemy (1993)The Immortal (1993)The Wicked Heart (1993)The Midnight Club (1994)The Lost Mind (1995)The Visitor (1995)The Starlight Crystal (1996)The Star Group (1997)Execution of Innocence (1997)Hollow Skull (1998)Magic Fire (1999)The Grave (1999)The Secret of Ka (2010)To Die For – Omnibus collects Slumber Party and Weekend (2010)Bound to You – Omnibus collects Spellbound and See You Later (2012)Witch World (2012)Black Knight - [Witch World 2] (2014)Strange Girl (2015)

SeriesCheerleadersCheerleaders #2: Getting Even (1985)
(Christopher Pike only wrote one book in this forty-seven book series. Other writers of this series include Caroline B. Cooney and Diane Hoh.)Chain LetterChain Letter (1986)Letter 2: The Ancient Evil (1992)Chained Together – Omnibus, collects Chain Letter 1 and 2. (1994)Final FriendsFinal Friends 1: The Party (1988)Final Friends 2: The Dance (1988)Final Friends 3: The Graduation (1989)Final Friends Trilogy – Omnibus, collects Final Friends 1, 2 and 3 (1999)Until the End – Omnibus, collects Final Friends 1, 2 and 3 (2011)Remember MeRemember Me (1989)Remember Me 2: The Return (1994)Remember Me 3: The Last Story (1995)Remember Me – Omnibus, collects Remember Me 1, 2 and 3 (2010)The Last Vampire/ThirstThe Last Vampire (1994)The Last Vampire 2: Black Blood (1994)The Last Vampire 3: Red Dice (1995)The Last Vampire 4: Phantom (1996)The Last Vampire 5: Evil Thirst (1996)The Last Vampire 6: Creatures of Forever (1996)Thirst No. 1 – Omnibus collects The Last Vampire 1, 2 and 3. (2009)Thirst No. 2 – Omnibus collects The Last Vampire 4, 5 and 6. (2010)Thirst No. 3: The Eternal Dawn (2010)Thirst No. 4: The Shadow of Death (2011)
Thirst – Boxed set collects Thirst No. 1, 2, and 3 (2013)Thirst No. 5: The Sacred Veil (2013)Thirst No. 6: Sita (TBA)Thirst No. 7 (TBA)SpooksvilleSpooksville – series of 24 children's books (1995–1998)AloshaAlosha (2004) (An animated movie version was in development, according to Pike's Facebook page.)The Shaktra (2005)The Yanti (2006)Nemi (TBA) (According to Pike, the book is complete, though will only be released if the movie adaptation of Alosha goes well.)

Short storiesTales of Terror – Six original short stories, includes a Master of Murder sequel: The Fan from Hell (1997)Tales of Terror #2 – Five original short stories, includes a Master of Murder sequel: The Burning Witch (1998)

AnthologiesThirteen: 13 Tales of Horror by 13 Masters of Horror – ed. T. Pines; contains Pike's stories Collect Call and Collect Call 2: The Black Walker (1991)666: The Number of the Beast – contains Pike's story Saving Face (2007)

Adult fictionSati (1990)The Season of Passage (1992)The Listeners (1995)The Cold One (1995)Seedling (Planned sequel to The Cold One, but was never written.)The Blind Mirror (2003)Falling (2007)The Sixth Door'' (TBA)

See also 
 R. L. Stine

References

External links

 
 
 
 Christopher Pike's Official Profile on Wattpad
 Christopher Pike's archived works on the Internet Archive

1954 births
20th-century American male writers
20th-century American novelists
20th-century American short story writers
21st-century American male writers
21st-century American novelists
21st-century American short story writers
American children's writers
American horror writers
American male novelists
American male short story writers
American writers of young adult literature
Ghost story writers
Living people
Novelists from New York (state)
Writers from New York City
Writers from Santa Barbara, California
Novelists from California